Air Collision is a 2012 American direct-to-video action film directed by Liz Adams and starring Reginald VelJohnson, Jordan Ladd and Gerald Webb. Air Collision was released on March 27, 2012 by The Asylum.

Plot
After a major electromagnetic storm cripples communications worldwide, a new satellite-based Airborne collision avoidance system (ACAT) air traffic control system is struck, with debris hitting the earth. The malfunctioning satellite puts all air traffic in danger on the U.S. east coast where it is being operated on a "pilot project".

Consequently, two aircraft are heading on a collision course. One is a commercial airliner carrying hundreds of passengers while the other is Air Force One, carrying President Phillips (Andy Clemence), the President of the United States, and his family. The ACAT begins sending out errant commands that put both aircraft into serious jeopardy.

In the severe electric storm, satellites begin failing with debris hitting major populated areas in the United States. Dr. Antonia "Toni" Pierce (Erin Coker) comes upon some of the debris and contacts Cleveland FAA Air Traffic controller Bob Abbot (Reginald VelJohnson). Abbot tries to prevent the looming disaster, overriding all top level directives to keep aircraft flying, he wants to ground all traffic.

Both the commercial airliner and Air Force One are struck by repeated lightning strikes that partially disable the aircraft. The damaged satellite signals cause the ACAT to wreak havoc on the escorting F-16 fighters. The McDonnell Douglas MD-80 airliner also loses both engines but gets a restart just before impacting. A rogue Sidewinder missile from Air Force One also strikes the converging airliner and both aircraft impact in a glancing hit. The airliner crash-lands in Cleveland.

An Air Force Lockheed C-130 Hercules rescue effort ultimately fails to bring Air Force One's passengers to safety, and electrical impulses affecting the president's aircraft kill the flight crew, leaving the only alternative being the President's daughter (Stephanie Hullar) attempting to disable the ACAT system. When the ACAT is finally overridden, the President takes control of Air Force One and brings it into a landing at Detroit.

Cast
 Reginald VelJohnson as Bob Abbot
 Jordan Ladd as Lindsay Bates
 Erin Coker as Dr. Antonia "Toni" Pierce
 Gerald Webb as First Officer Ken Aoki
 Michael Teh as Captain Roscoe Simms
 Darin Cooper as Colonel Chuck Lawler
 Darren Anthony Thomas as Major Eric Lewis
 Andy Clemence as President Phillips
 Meredith Thomas as First Lady Kimberly Phillips
 Stephanie Hullar as Milani Phillips
 Caryn Ward as Presidential Purser Joan Watts (Caryn Ward Ross)
 Aurora Perrineau as Radhika Darshan
 Dave Vescio as Eli Reyher
 Korey Simeone as Cody Marler
 Jonathan Nation as Brent Powel
 Jewel Greenberg as Carlene Wheeler
 Edward L. Green as Klaus Ingram

Production
Principal photography took place at Santa Clarita, California. Footage of Air Force One was featured. In reality VC-25As are Boeing 747-200Bs, not the 747-400 shown in the movie.

Reception
While not reviewed by critics in mainstream media, Air Collision did have a brief theatrical run and did garner some interest from internet bloggers and other film critics. Michael Allen in 28dayslateranalysis.com said, "'Air Collision' is not really a mockbuster, as director Liz Adams experiments with the disaster genre. The film is pure fantasy. The President of the United States' life is in danger, satellites fall from the sky and special agents fly through the air. This is ridiculous! But, maybe that is the magic that drives The Asylum production machine. 'Air Collision' requires that viewers have fertile imaginations as well. There are just too many strange going-ons to see this film as believable on any level. And, perhaps, therein lies the charm of The Asylum's latest."

In a similar vein, Christopher Armstead in Film Critics United said, "I was initially going to advise you that an unhealthy dose of suspended belief will be required to get the most of ‘Air Collision’, but upon further examination... don't bother.  You see almost from beginning to end, almost nothing that happens in this movie has any real relation to anything that could possibly happen on the actual Planet Earth.  ... But what is it that makes ‘Air Collision’ arguably the greatest Asylum movie ever?  Because it goes.  And it goes.  And just when you think it's about to slow down, it goes some more.  Because while the movie itself is completely ludicrous, the stellar cast of hundreds took this movie deadly serious which created a perfect storm of serious insanity."

References

Notes

Bibliography

 Dorr, Robert F. Air Force One. St. Paul, Minnesota: Motorbooks International, 2002. .

External links
 
 

American action films
The Asylum films
American disaster films
American aviation films
2012 action films
2012 independent films
2012 films
Films set on airplanes
Films shot in Los Angeles County, California
Films about Air Force One
2010s English-language films
2010s American films